Go With It may refer to:

"Go With It", song by American R&B band The Internet from Ego Death (album) 
"Go With It", song by MNDR produced by Tokimonsta Peter Wade Keusch
"Go With It", song by Oliver from Full Circle (Oliver album)
"Go With It", song by Pete Yorn Nightcrawler (album)